XHMORE-FM (98.9 MHz) is a commercial FM radio station in Tijuana, Baja California. The station broadcasts with an effective radiated power (ERP) of 50,000 watts and serves the Tijuana-San Diego radio market. The station is currently silent after the More FM programming moved online-only in May 2022.

History
XHQF-FM received its concession on September 8, 1977. It was owned by Jorge Méndez Alemán, who had sought a station since the late 1960s and was initially awarded 97.7 MHz. In March 1986, control passed to its current concessionaire.

For a number of years prior to 1993, XHQF had programmed a Top 40/CHR format with most of the music being in English and the presentation in Spanish. By 1994, it evolved into a Rock en Español format as "More FM," with the XHMORE-FM call sign.  This first incarnation as a Rock station lasted until 2004, when it flipped to an English-language rhythmic contemporary format as "Blazin' 98.9."  Market competitors included XHITZ-FM (licensed to Mexico) and KHTS-FM (licensed to the United States).  In 2009, the music stopped and the station adopted a sports radio format as the local ESPN Radio network affiliate.  On September 1, 2010, ESPN Radio was replaced by the Rock en Español format, in its second incarnation; ESPN Radio migrated to XEPE.

TJ/SD
Effective March 31, 2018, Grupo Cadena signed a sales and marketing agreement with Flip Media, owned by Randal Phillips, to relaunch the station as well as sister XEWV-FM in Mexicali as "TJ SD," with San Diego rock radio veteran Michael Halloran heading the programming department.  One advantage of the operating arrangement with Flip, according to Phillips, was that the rental expenses for XHMORE would be lower than those of comparable Mexican stations operated from the United States. However, the flip to "TJ SD" never occurred.

On May 22, 2022, Grupo Cadena ceased broadcast operations on its terrestrial stations, moving XHMORE's "Rock en Español" format to internet only.

References

External links
More FM website

Radio stations in Tijuana
Mass media in San Diego County, California
Radio stations established in 1977